Napoli Piazza Amedeo is an underground rail station on the Villa Literno line in Naples, Italy.

The station went into service September 20, 1925, with the activation of the railway from Naples to Pozzuoli Solfatara (the so-called "underground").

The station has a pavilion made of reinforced concrete which leads through a long tunnel leading to the turnstiles and the docks. The station is located in the Rione Amedeo, in the heart of Naples' wealthy, near nightlife. It is also close to Via dei Mille, Via Calabritto and Piazza dei Martiri, which are lined with designer boutiques. The station is also well connected by Chiaia Funicular to Vomero.

The station is served by subway trains, labeled Line 2.

Railway stations in Naples
Railway stations in Italy opened in the 21st century